Maykopsky (masculine), Maykopskaya (feminine), or Maykopskoye (neuter) may refer to:
Maykopsky District, a district of the Republic of Adygea, Russia
Maykopsky (rural locality), a rural locality (a khutor) in Rostov Oblast, Russia
Maykopskoye, a rural locality (a selo) in Krasnodar Krai, Russia